Eusebio Jiménez Peñalver (1897 – death unknown) was a Cuban infielder in the Negro leagues and Cuban League in the 1920s. 

A native of Havana, Cuba, Jiménez made his Negro leagues debut in 1920 with the Cuban Stars (East). He played for the Cuban Stars (West) in 1921 before returning to the East club in 1922, and played briefly for Habana of the Cuban League to finish his career.

References

External links
 and Baseball-Reference Black Baseball stats and Seamheads

1897 births
Date of birth missing
Place of death missing
Year of death missing
Cuban Stars (East) players
Cuban Stars (West) players
Habana players
Baseball players from Havana
Baseball infielders